Tommy Macias (born 20 January 1993) is a Swedish judoka. He is the 2018 and 2017 European bronze medalist in the 73 kg division. In 2018 he won the Grand Prix in Antalya and Cancun, he also took the bronze in Abu Dhabi Grand Slam and Osaka Grand Slam. In 2017 he took the bronze in IJF Masters St Petersburg and gold in Abu Dhabi Grand Slam. 2019 he won the gold in Ekaterinburg Grand Slam.

He competed in the men's 73 kg event at the 2020 Summer Olympics in Tokyo, Japan.

References

External links
 
 

1993 births
Swedish male judoka
Living people
Judoka at the 2015 European Games
Judoka at the 2019 European Games
European Games medalists in judo
European Games gold medalists for Sweden
Judoka at the 2020 Summer Olympics
Olympic judoka of Sweden
21st-century Swedish people